Hasnain Bokhari (born 24 June 1991) is a Pakistani cricketer. He made his first-class debut for Multan Tigers in the 2014–15 Quaid-e-Azam Trophy on 30 October 2014. He made his List A debut for Multan in the 2018–19 Quaid-e-Azam One Day Cup on 6 September 2018.

References

External links
 

1991 births
Living people
Pakistani cricketers
Multan cricketers
Place of birth missing (living people)